Alan Joseph McDonald (23 June 1918 – 2 May 1999) was an Australian rules football player who played in the VFL between 1939 and 1941 and then again in 1943 for the Richmond Football Club. He coached South Bendigo from 1947 to 1956, then was senior coach of Richmond from 1957 to 1960.

References 

 Hogan P: The Tigers Of Old, Richmond FC, Melbourne 1996

Richmond Football Club players
Richmond Football Club coaches
Leongatha Football Club players
South Bendigo Football Club players
Australian rules footballers from Victoria (Australia)
1918 births
1999 deaths